The Cisadane River is a  long river in northern West Java, Indonesia. 
The river has its source at Mount Pangrango, and passes through Bogor and Tangerang before flowing to the Java Sea.

The rivers in Banten, the westernmost province of Java,  run roughly parallel to each other.
The main ones are the Peteh, called the Banten on the lower reaches near the city of Kota Banten, the Ujung, which enters the sea at Pontang, the Durian, which enters the sea at Tanara, the Manceuri, and the Sadane.
The Ci Sadane rises in the mountainous region of Priyangan and in 1682 formed the border between the Dutch East India Company (VOC) territory and Batavia (modern Jakarta).

The Durian, Manceuri and Sadane rivers flow through the Tangerang Plain.
In 1911 the colonial government started to prepare an irrigation plan, and in 1914 determined that various tracts in the plain should be subject to compulsory purchase for this purpose.
In 1919 a plan was issued where the north of the plain would be irrigated by the Ci Sadane and the southern area by the Ci Durian.

Its tributaries include the Cianten and Ciapus. The river has a watershed area of approximately 1,370 km2.

See also
 List of rivers of Java
 List of rivers of Indonesia

References

Sources

Rivers of West Java
Rivers of Banten
Rivers of Indonesia